The boxing competition at the 2000 Summer Olympics in Sydney, Australia was held at the Sydney Convention and Exhibition Centre in Darling Harbour. The event was only open to men and bouts were contested over four rounds of two minutes each. Five judges scored the fighters in real time and the boxer with the most points at the end was the winner.

Like other Olympic combat sports, two bronze medals are awarded; in the case of boxing, both losing semi-finalists receive a bronze medal, with no further play-off. As a result, the quarter-final essentially equates to a bronze medal match, a semi-final to a silver medal match, and the final to a gold medal match. 48 medals are therefore available, half of which are bronze medals.

Competition format

Men competed in the following twelve events:

Medalists

Medal summary

Medal table

Participating nations

310 boxers from 77 nations participated in the 2000 Summer Olympics.

References

External links
Official Olympic Report
 Official Results – Boxing
 Results on Amateur Boxing 

 
2000
2000 Summer Olympics events
O
International boxing competitions hosted by Australia